1st Mountain Division may refer to:

 1st Mountain Division (Wehrmacht)
 1st Mountain Division (Bundeswehr), unit of post-WW2 German Army